Danny O'Brien (born 1969) is a British technology journalist and civil liberties activist. He is the International Director of the Electronic Frontier Foundation.

Career

He wrote weekly columns for The Sunday Times and The Irish Times; and before that for The Guardian, and acted as a consultant in helping The Guardian formulate its online strategy. He worked for the UK edition of Wired, as well as for Channel 4 and the British ISP Virgin.net. Together with Dave Green, he founded and wrote the now-defunct email newsletter Need to Know and with whom he also co-wrote and -presented the television show 404 Not Found.

In May 2005, he succeeded Ren Bucholz as Activist Coordinator for the Electronic Frontier Foundation, and then became EFF's International Outreach Coordinator. In April 2010, he moved to a new position as Internet Advocacy Coordinator for the Committee to Protect Journalists. In February 2013, he became the Director of the International Department at the Electronic Frontier Foundation.

He was Director of Strategy at the EFF from Jul 2019 – Jun 2021.

He become a Senior Fellow at the Filecoin Foundation, and Filecoin Foundation for the Decentralized Web in July 2021

O'Brien also set up a pledge on PledgeBank to help coordinate the establishment of "an organisation that will campaign for digital rights in the UK", which led to the creation of the Open Rights Group.

Family
O'Brien is married to Liz Henry. He was previously married to Quinn Norton, with whom he has a daughter.

See also 

 Life hack

References

External links 

 Oblomovka — O'Brien's weblog
 O'Brien's homepage

1969 births
Living people
British bloggers
British male journalists
Place of birth missing (living people)
20th-century British journalists
21st-century British journalists
Male bloggers